Richard Goodenough may refer to:

Richard Goodenough, plotter with Nathaniel Wade
Sir Richard Edmund Goodenough, 2nd Baronet (1925–1996), of the Goodenough baronets